Alexander "Joe" Hogarty was an American football player and coach, as well as a collegiate basketball coach and athletic director.

Bethany College
Hogarty served as the head football coach at Bethany College in Bethany, West Virginia in 1913.

Duquesne University
Hogarty  served as the head men's basketball coach (1913–1914) and athletic director at Duquesne University in Pittsburgh, Pennsylvania.

Professional football
Hogarty spent one season playing for the Dayton Triangles of the Ohio League in 1918. He played both quarterback and halfback.

In October of 1918, he accepted a position as athletic director at Camp Taylor in Louisville, Kentucky.

References

Year of birth missing
Year of death missing
American football halfbacks
American football quarterbacks
Bethany Bison football coaches
Dayton Triangles players
Duquesne Dukes athletic directors
Duquesne Dukes men's basketball coaches